Antoine and Sebastian is a 1974 French comedy-drama film directed by Jean-Marie Périer and starring François Périer, Jacques Dutronc,  Ottavia Piccolo and Keith Carradine.

Cast 
 François Périer as Antoine
 Jacques Dutronc as Sébastien
 Ottavia Piccolo as Nathalie
 Keith Carradine as John
 Marisa Pavan as  Mathilde
 Marie Dubois as Corinne
 Pierre Tornade as  Max
 Jacques François as The Captain
  Hadi Kalafate as  Gamelle
  Jean Michaud as The Editor
 Olivier Hussenot as Géraldi
  Francine Custer as  Jérichote
 Robert Deslandes  as  Raymond
 Oreste Lionello as  Ledieu

References

External links

1974 comedy-drama films
1974 films
French comedy-drama films
Films directed by Jean-Marie Périer
1970s French-language films
1970s French films